Karmakanic is a Swedish progressive rock group founded in Malmö in 2002 by bassist and keyboardist Jonas Reingold. They are currently signed to Inside Out Music.

Members
 Göran Edman - vocals
 Nils Erikson - vocals, keyboards
 Krister Jonsson - guitars
 Jonas Reingold - bass
 Lalle Larsson - keyboards
 Morgan Ågren - drums

Discography
Entering the Spectra - 7 October 2002 (Regain)
Wheel of Life - 14 September 2004 (The End)
Who's the Boss in the Factory? - 18 November 2008 (Inside Out)
In a Perfect World - 26 July 2011 (Inside Out)
 DOT - 22 July 2016

References

Swedish progressive rock groups
Musical groups established in 2002
Inside Out Music artists